Year 1079 (MLXXIX) was a common year starting on Tuesday (link will display the full calendar) of the Julian calendar.

Events 
 By place 

 Europe 
 April 11 – Stanislaus of Szczepanów, bishop of Kraków, is executed on orders by King Bolesław II the Generous. The way in which his sentence is carried out causes a revolt among the Polish nobles. Bolesław is forced to flee, to take refuge at the court of King Ladislaus I of Hungary. He is succeeded by his brother Władysław I, as ruler of Poland.
 Battle of Cabra: Moorish forces, aided by Castilian knights under El Cid (Rodrigo Diaz), defeat and rout the invading army of Emir Abdallah ibn Buluggin of Granada, near the town of Cabra (modern Spain).
 Emperor Henry IV appoints Frederick I as duke of Swabia at Hohenstaufen Castle. Henry's 7-year-old daughter Agnes of Waiblingen is betrothed to Frederick who founds the Hohenstaufen Dynasty. 
 Upon the death of Håkan the Red, Halsten Stenkilsson returns as king of Sweden, jointly with his brother Inge the Elder (approximate date).

 England 
 King William the Conqueror establishes the New Forest in Southern England. He proclaims it as a royal forest, using it for hunting, mainly of deer.

 Seljuk Empire 
 The Seljuk Turks under Sultan Suleiman ibn Qutulmish reach and occupy the western coast of Asia Minor, an area known since the Archaic Period (c. 800–c. 500 BC) as Ionia (modern Turkey).

 By topic 

 Astronomy 
 Omar Khayyam, Persian mathematician and astronomer, calculates a 33 year calendar consisting of 25 ordinary years that include 365 days, and 8 leap years that include 366 days, the most accurate calculation of his time. Khayyam, in his Treatise on Demonstrations of Problems in Algebra, produces a complete classification of cubic equations and their geometric solutions (approximate date).

 Religion 
 Constance, queen of Castile and León, founds a monastery in Burgos (approximate date).

Births 
 February 11 – Yejong, king of Goryeo (d. 1122)
 April – Urraca, queen regnant of León, Castile and Galicia (d. 1126)
 August 8 – Horikawa, emperor of Japan (d. 1107)
 Abū Ṭāhir al-Silafī, Fatimid scholar and writer (d. 1180)
 Berardo dei Marsi, Italian cardinal and bishop (d. 1130)
 Dangereuse de l'Isle Bouchard, French noblewoman (d. 1151)
 Gampopa, Tibetan Buddhist monk and teacher (d. 1153)
 Kilij Arslan I, sultan of the Sultanate of Rum (d. 1107)
 Liu, Chinese empress of the Song dynasty (d. 1113)
 Peter Abelard, French scholastic philosopher (d. 1142)
 Zheng, Chinese empress of the Song dynasty (d. 1131)
 Approximate date – Diepold III, margrave of Vohburg

Deaths 
 January 8 – Adela of France, countess of Flanders (b. 1009)
 February 22 – John of Fécamp, Italian-Norman abbot 
 April 11 – Stanislaus of Szczepanów, Polish bishop (b. 1030)
 August 2 – Roman Svyatoslavich, Kievan prince
 August 5 – Hezilo (or Hettilo), bishop of Hildesheim
 November 16 – Cao, empress of the Song dynasty (b. 1016)
 Adelaide of Savoy, duchess of Swabia (approximate date)
 Aedh Ua Flaithbheartaigh, king of Iar Connacht
 Al-Jayyānī, Arab scholar and mathematician (b. 989)
 Atsiz ibn Uvaq, Turkish emir of Damascus (or 1078)
 Cellach húa Rúanada, Irish chief ollam and poet
 Håkan the Red, king of Sweden (approximate date)
 Íñigo López, Spanish nobleman (approximate date)
 John of Avranches, French archbishop and writer
 Odo of Rennes, duke and regent of Brittany (b. 999)
 Roger d'Ivry (or Perceval), Norman nobleman
 Wen Tong, Chinese painter and calligrapher (b. 1019)

References